Patrick J. Maguire (died 4 July 1970) was an Irish Fianna Fáil politician. A medical doctor, he was elected to Dáil Éireann as a Teachta Dála (TD) for the Monaghan constituency at the 1948 general election, and was re-elected at the 1951 general election. He did not contest the 1954 general election.

References

Year of birth missing
1970 deaths
Fianna Fáil TDs
Members of the 13th Dáil
Members of the 14th Dáil
Politicians from County Monaghan